Porte de Vanves is a station on line 13 of the Paris Métro and a stop on tramway line 3a.

The station was opened on 21 January 1937 on old Line 14, which was absorbed into 13 in 1976. It was the southern terminus of the line until its extension to Châtillon - Montrouge on 9 November 1976. In 2006, Paris Tramway Line 3 (now 3a) opened, with a stop at Porte de Vanves. It is named after the Porte de Vanves, a gate in the nineteenth century Thiers wall of Paris, which led to the town of Vanves.

Station layout

Gallery

References
Roland, Gérard (2003). Stations de métro. D’Abbesses à Wagram. Éditions Bonneton.

Paris Métro stations in the 14th arrondissement of Paris
Railway stations in France opened in 1937